This is a list of parks, beaches, sports grounds, marine reserves and other protected areas in the Gisborne District of New Zealand's North Island.

See also
List of marae in the Gisborne District
List of schools in the Gisborne District

References

Gisborne Region